Berowra Heights is an outer suburb of Northern Sydney, in the state of New South Wales, Australia 39 kilometres north of the Sydney central business district, in the local government area of Hornsby Shire. Berowra Heights is north-west of the suburb of Berowra and east of Berowra Waters.

History
Berowra is an Aboriginal word that means place of many shells.

Berowra Heights Post Office opened on 2 September 1968.

Demographics
According to the 2021 census, there are 5,286 residents of Berowra Heights. 77.9% of these residents were born in Australia, while the most common other countries of birth are England (6.7%), New Zealand (1.3%), China (1.1%), South Africa (1%) and The Philippines (0.7%). 88.8% of residents only speak English at home, while other languages spoken at home include Mandarin (1.1%), Russian (0.6%), Spanish (0.6%), Persian (0.6%) and German (0.5%). The most common religious affiliations are No Religion (42.9%), Catholic (20.8%) and Anglican (17.8%).

Commercial area
Business is conducted in three shopping areas; the highway precinct, the Village Green and Berowra Marketplace (Foodtown). Businesses include a  Bakers Delight, Bendigo Bank Community Bank, Coles supermarket, two pharmacies, a comprehensive medical centre and a range of restaurants.

Transport
Access to Berowra Heights is by road from Berowra, to the east, via Berowra Waters Road. Alternatively, the Berowra Waters Ferry, a car ferry, connects Berowra Waters with the western end of Berowra Waters Road. Transdev NSW route 599 provides a bus service from Berowra Heights to Berowra railway station and route 597 from Berowra to Hornsby railway station.

Schools
There are two primary schools in Berowra Heights and two in Berowra:

 St Bernard's Catholic Primary School (Berowra Heights).
 Wideview Public School (Berowra Heights).
 Berowra Public School (Berowra).
 Berowra Christian School (Berowra).

Churches 
Together, Berowra and Berowra Heights have four churches:

 St Mark's Anglican Church (Berowra).
 Berowra Baptist Church (Berowra).
 St Bernard's Catholic Church (Berowra Heights).
 Berowra Uniting Church (Berowra Heights).

Services
Bush fires present a very real threat for the Berowra area due to the proximity of bushland. Fire protection for urbanised parts of Berowra Heights is provided by Station 75 (Berowra) of Fire and Rescue NSW and supported by Community Fire Units. Fire protection for bushland parts of Berowra Heights is provided by the NSW New South Wales Rural Fire Service, through the Berowra Rural Fire Brigade, located in new purpose built premises (opened 11 August 2018) at 14a Berowra Waters Road in Berowra.

See also 
 Berowra
 Rural Fire Service – NSW Rural Fire
 Bakers Delight Berowra
 Berowra Waters
 Dangar Island
 Hawkesbury River Railway Bridge
 Hawkesbury River
 Ku-ring-gai Chase National Park

References

Notes
The Book of Sydney Suburbs, Compiled by Frances Pollen, Angus & Robertson Publishers, 1990, Published in Australia

External links
Berowra Community Home Page and Directory
The Bush Telegraph: Local newsletter for Berowra and surrounding areas
  [CC-By-SA]

Suburbs of Sydney
Hornsby Shire